Khadir may refer to:

 Khadir, Iran, in Fars Province, Iran
 Khadir District, Afghanistan
 Khadir and Bangar, an alluvial region of North India and Pakistan 
 Khadir, an Iranian family name, as e.g. Amir Khadir, Canadian politician 
 Khidr or al-Khidr, a figure described in the Quran